The Asian Chess Federation (ACF) is the continental governing body of the sport of chess in Asia.

Tournaments 
 Asian Chess Championship

References

External links 
 Facebook page

Chess organizations
Sports governing bodies in Asia
Chess in Asia